Lonthoir is a village on the island of Banda Besar in Indonesia.

Lonthoir may also refer to:

 Banda Besar, an island in Indonesia